The Ogdensburg Bridge and Port Authority owns two segments of shortline railroad that are operated by a private contractor dba the New York and Ogdensburg Railway . This railroad serves the Port of Ogdensburg and connects with CSX Transportation, thus providing intermodal service for industries of northern and central New York, as well as southeastern Ontario, Canada.

External links

 NY&O information page
 Official Site

New York (state) railroads